Buddy Bolden's Rag (subtitled [100 Years of Jazz]) is an album by the American jazz trumpeter Malachi Thompson, recorded and released by the Delmark label in 1995.

Reception

AllMusic reviewer Alex Henderson stated: "On Buddy Bolden's Rag, Thompson and his band Africa Brass salute Bolden in an unconventional way; instead of playing traditional New Orleans jazz, they provide inside/outside post-bop that acknowledges Crescent City brass bands as well as avant-garde and AACM jazz. Thompson looks back on jazz's early history but does so without being the least bit dogmatic about it, and the result is a very enriching and unpredictable CD".

Track listing
All compositions by Malachi Thompson except where noted
 "Buddy Bolden's Rag" – 5:58
 "World View" – 8:32
 "The Chaser in Brazil" – 5:44
 "We Bop" (Lester Bowie) – 5:40
 "Nubian Call" – 12:42	
 "The Chaser in America" – 8:49
 "Kojo Time" (Roland Alexander) – 7:17
 "Harold the Great" (Bill McFarland) – 9:49
 "A Mouse in the House" – 6:43

Personnel
Malachi Thompson – trumpet, conch shell, steer horn, sekulu
David Spencer, Phillip Perkins, Kenny Anderson – trumpet 
Bill McFarland, Edwin Williams, Ray Ripperton – trombone
Steve Berry – bass trombone
Kirk Brown – piano 
Harrison Bankhead – bass
Darryl Ervin – drums 
Dr. Cuz, Richard Lawrence – percussion
Guests:
Lester Bowie – trumpet (tracks 3, 5 & 6)  
Ari Brown – tenor saxophone (track 8)
Zane Massey – tenor saxophone (track 7)

References

Delmark Records albums
1995 albums
Malachi Thompson albums
Albums produced by Bob Koester